Moustafa Esmail (born 23 June 1965) is an Egyptian boxer. He competed at the 1988 Summer Olympics and the 1992 Summer Olympics.

References

1965 births
Living people
Egyptian male boxers
Olympic boxers of Egypt
Boxers at the 1988 Summer Olympics
Boxers at the 1992 Summer Olympics
Place of birth missing (living people)
AIBA World Boxing Championships medalists
Flyweight boxers
20th-century Egyptian people